Badugi (also known as badougi, paduki or padooki) is a draw poker variant similar to triple draw, with hand-values similar to lowball. The betting structure and overall play of the game is identical to a standard poker game using blinds, but, unlike traditional poker which involves a minimum of five cards, players' hands contain only four cards at any one time. During each of three drawing rounds, players can trade zero to four cards from their hands for new ones from the deck, in an attempt to form the best badugi hand and win the pot. Badugi is often a gambling game, with the object being to win money in the form of pots. The winner of the pot is the person with the best badugi hand at the conclusion of play (known as the showdown). Badugi is played in cardrooms around the world, as well as online, in rooms such as PokerStars. Although it hasn’t had its own tournament per se at the WSOP, it is featured in the Dealers Choice events as well as in the Triple Draw Mix. The 2023 WSOP event does have a Badugi tournament scheduled.

Origin

Game origin
There is some controversy over the origin of this game, which has been played at least since the 1980s. Bill Rosmus reports that in the 1980s in Winnipeg, Canada it was played under the name Off Suit Lowball in the back room of pool halls and back room poker clubs. Bryan Micon says he has been told by several Korean players that it was also played in South Korea in the 1980s. The name of the game means “black and white spotted dog” in Korean. The game Go has a similar name in Korean, “baduk”, derived from the same word.

Another ancestor of badugi is displayed in a game played in Toronto in the 1970s and 1980s, "off on high low", and its variant" leapfrog." In both games the objective was to make a 5 card hand, with a pair being mandatory. Either an "off" hand (all 4 other cards different suits), or an "on" hand (all 4 other cards of one suit). "Leapfrog" made this much more difficult with stipulation that the cards must not "touch" each other, in terms of pip value. Oftentimes, the pot would "stay," making for a juicy start to the next hand.

Etymology
Nick Wedd reports that the Korean word baduk, or badug refers to a black and white pattern—a black and white pet dog may be called "badugi"—which gives rise to the Korean name baduk for the board game Go, played with black and white stones.

Play of the hand

Play begins with each player being dealt four cards face down. The hand begins with a "pre-draw" betting round, beginning with the player to the left of the big blind (or the player to the left of the dealer, if no blinds are used) and continuing clockwise. Each player must either call the amount of the big blind (put in an amount equal to the big blind), fold (relinquish any claim to the pot), or raise (put in more money than anyone else, thus requiring others to do the same, or fold).

Once everyone has put the same amount of money in the pot or folded, play proceeds to the draw. Beginning with the first player still in the pot to the left of the dealer, each player may discard any number of cards and receive an equal number of replacement cards (called the "draw"). Replacement cards are dealt before the next player chooses the number of cards to draw. The discarded cards are not returned to the deck but are discarded for the remainder of the hand unless the deck becomes depleted, at which point the discards are reshuffled to reform the deck (this could be in the middle of a draw request, but the deck should first be depleted, then reformed after which the draw may continue from the reformed deck).

The first draw is followed by a second betting round. Here players are free to check (not put in any money, but also remain in the hand) until someone bets. Again betting proceeds until all players have put in an equal amount of money or folded. After the second betting round ends, there is another draw followed by a third betting round. After that there is the final draw, followed by a fourth betting round and the showdown, if necessary.

If at any time all players but one have folded, the sole remaining player is awarded the pot. If there is more than one player remaining at the conclusion of the final betting round, the hands of those players are compared and the player with the best badugi hand is awarded the pot.

Hand evaluation

Badugi ranks cards low to high as in traditional poker, except with aces being low.  Thereafter, there is a different ranking of hands than traditional poker, with hands having distinct sets of ranks and suits being superior. Then, for sets of equal size, hands with lower rank of cards are superior (as in lowball).

The badugi hand can consist of 1–4 cards of distinct rank and suit.  Any duplicated suit or rank in a hand is disregarded. Any four-card badugi hand beats a three-card badugi hand, a three-card hand beats a two-card hand, and a two-card hand beats a one-card hand. A four-card badugi hand that consists of all four suits is called a "badugi".

Two badugi hands containing the same number of cards are evaluated by comparing the highest ranking card in each hand (where ace is low). As in lowball, the hand with the lower ranking high card is superior. If there is a tie for the highest card, the second highest card (if there is one) is compared. If the ranks of all the cards in the badugi hand are the same, the two hands tie. Suits are irrelevant in the comparison of two hands.

The best possible hand is A234 of four different suits.

Here are a few additional examples:
 beats  since the former is a four-card hand and the latter is a three-card hand. (The  is disregarded as a duplicate spade, so the hand is a three-card 247.)
 beats  They reduce to the three-card hands A59 and A2J. 
The redundant ( and ) do not affect the strength of the hands as they are disregarded.
 beats  as the former is a three-card hand (after disregarding the ) while the latter is a two-card hand (both kings are disregarded since each is the same suit as another card in the hand).

If one can construct two (or more) different badugi hands with the same four cards (as in the final example), the better badugi hand is evaluated against the other hands. This occurs when there are at least two cards of the same suit; one of which is paired. Here, disregarding the paired, suited card generates a better hand than disregarding any other card.

Example hand

Here is a sample deal involving four players. The players' individual hands will not be revealed until the showdown, to give a better sense of what happens during play:

Compulsory bets: Alice is the dealer. Bob, to Alice's left, posts a small blind of $1, and Carol posts a big blind of $2.

First betting round: Alice deals four cards face down to each player, beginning with Bob and ending with herself. Ted must act first because he is the first player after the big blind. He cannot check, since the $2 big blind plays as a bet, so he folds. Alice calls the $2. Bob adds an additional $1 to his $1 small blind to call the $2 total. Carol's blind is "live", so she has the option to raise here, but she checks instead, ending the first betting round. The pot now contains $6, $2 from each of three players.

First draw: Each player may now opt to draw up to four cards in an attempt to improve his hand. Bob, who is to the dealer's immediate left, is given the first chance to draw. Bob discards two cards and receives two replacement cards from the top of the deck. Bob's discarded cards are not added to the deck, but removed from play. Carol now also chooses to draw two. Finally, Alice chooses to draw one.

Second betting round: Since there are no forced bets in later betting rounds, Bob is now first to act. He chooses to check, remaining in the hand without betting. Carol bets, adding $2 to the pot. Alice and Bob both call, each adding $2 to the pot. The pot now contains $12.

Second draw: Bob draws one. Carol opts not to draw any cards, keeping the four she has (known as standing pat). Alice draws one.

Third betting round: Bob checks again and Carol bets $4. Alice, this round, raises making the total bet $8. Bob folds and Carol calls the additional $4. The pot now contains $28.

Third draw: Since Bob has folded, Carol is now first to act. She opts to draw one. Alice stands pat (does not draw).

Last betting round: Carol checks and Alice bets $4. Carol calls.

Showdown: Alice shows  for a nine-high badugi (or four card hand). Carol has , an eight-high badugi. Carol wins the $36 pot.

Betting structures

In casino play, it is common to use a fixed limit and two blinds. The limit for the first two rounds of betting is called a small bet, while the limit for the third and fourth betting rounds is called a big bet and is generally double the small bet. The small blind is usually equal to half of a small bet, and the big blind is equal to a full small bet.

This game is also played pot-limit, half-pot-limit, and rarely, no-limit. These structures allow for more range in the amounts bet.

Strategy
Like other card games with a fixed order of play, position can be an important component in badugi strategy. Players who are last to act often have an opportunity to bluff since they are able to observe the actions of other players before they act. In addition, players in late position are able to determine the strength of their hand more accurately by observing the actions of other players. Overall, people tend to play Badugi tighter than other draw games, meaning they fold more hands pre-draw. This seems to be advisable to everyone.

When drawing one card, there are only ten cards which will fill the badugi, the members of the fourth suit which don't pair the other three cards. A player holding a badugi can use this to estimate odds. For example, a player with an 8 high hand, knows at most 5 cards (A to 8, less the three pairs) will fill an opponent's hand.

Another aspect of the strategy of badugi involves the number of people at the table. The more people there are at the table, the more likely there is to be a 4-card badugi. Bluffing with a 2 or 3 card hand is not usually advisable when playing at a 6-player table. When playing with fewer than 4 people, bluffing becomes potentially more effective with a three-card hand.

With a one-card draw, the chance of making a badugi is approximately 21% per draw.

In badugi, the pot odds often justify or contradict making a call or folding a hand.

References

Further reading
 James McManus, 2009, "Cowboys Full: The Story of Poker," p. 427, New York:Macmillan, 
 Victor H. Royer, 2014, "Badugi," in "Powerful Profits From Internet Poker," pp. 274–280, Fort Lee, NJ:Lyle Stuart/Barricade, 
 Alex Scott, 2011, "Badugi," in "What I Know about Poker: Lessons in Texas Hold'em, Omaha and Other Poker Games," pp. 33–36, 
 David Sklansky, 2009, "A Note on Badugi," in "Poker, Gaming, & Life: Fighting Fuzzy Thinking," pp. 98f, Henderson, NV:Two Plus Two Publishing, 

Draw poker
Korean card games